George Johnstone (10 December 1764 – 20 November 1813) was a British politician. He sat in the House of Commons of Great Britain and then in the House of Commons of the United Kingdom from 1800 to 1813.

Johnstone was born in Pensacola, Florida.  He was one of four illegitimate sons of George Johnstone, then a captain in the Royal Navy, later an admiral. His mother was Martha Ford.

He was elected at a by-election in 1800 as Member of Parliament (MP) for the borough of Aldeburgh.
The following year, he bought an estate in Wales and began canvassing the borough of Hedon in Yorkshire, and topped the poll at the 1802 general election.
He was re-elected 3 times, facing a contest only in 1807,
and held the seat until his death in 1813.

See also
Cannizaro Park

References

External links 
 

1764 births
1813 deaths
Members of the Parliament of Great Britain for English constituencies
British MPs 1796–1800
Members of the Parliament of the United Kingdom for English constituencies
UK MPs 1801–1802
UK MPs 1802–1806
UK MPs 1807–1812
UK MPs 1812–1818
British East India Company people